Mosquita y Mari is a 2012 coming-of-age film written and directed by Aurora Guerrero and starring Fenessa Pineda and Venecia Troncoso. It premiered at the 2012 Sundance Film Festival.

Plot
When Yolanda Olveros meets her new neighbor Mari Rodriguez, all they see in each other are their differences. An only child, sheltered Yolanda's sole concern is fulfilling her parents' dream of a college-bound future. With her father's recent death, street-wise Mari, the elder of two, carries the weight of her sister as their mother works to keep them above water.

But despite their contrasting realities, Yolanda and Mari are soon brought together when Mari is threatened with expulsion after saving Yolanda from an incident at school. The girls forge a friendship that soon proves more complex than anticipated when the girls unexpectedly experience an intimate moment between them.

As Yolanda and Mari's feelings reach new depths, their inability to put words to their emotions leads to a web of unspoken jealousy.  Mari ends up meeting with a boy from the street for money in their study hideaway.  The two girls spend time apart.  The final scene shows them looking at each other from opposing sides of the street, with gentle smiles.

Cast 
Fenessa Pineda as Yolanda Olveros (nicknamed Mosquita)

Venecia Troncoso as Mari Rodriguez

Joaquín Garrido as Mr. Olveros

Laura Pataleno as Mrs. Olveros

Dulce Maria Solis as Mrs. Rodriguez

Marisela Uscanga as Vicky

Melissa Uscanga as Vero

Omar Leyva as Mr. Galvez

Armando Cosio as Don Pedro

Production

Conception 
The concept for Mosquita y Mari started out as a series of short stories about two girls growing up together and driven by an "unspoken attraction" to each other, heavily based on a friendship she had experienced in her youth, which Guerrero wrote in film school for an exercise about "writing what you know". Over the next seven years, Guerrero added to the series and finally edited it down into a single feature film. She has described the writing process as liberating.

Funding and Development 
The film had a $80,000 production budget, which was funded entirely on Kickstarter.

Guerrero worked with Communities for a Better Environment to ensure that the production of Mosquita y Mari would be beneficial to Huntington Park, where it was set and filmed. As a result, film production used a youth mentorship program. According to Guerrero, "anyone interested in media was brought on to the film and mentored by one of the department heads, depending on the interest of the young person." Every department head in the film mentored a youth from the area. As a result of the program, the majority of young characters in the film were played by residents of Huntington Park, and the film had additional access to shooting locations scouted and secured at a discount by locals. The young actors helped modify some of the dialogue to more accurately reflect modern high school lingo.

Guerrero searched SoundCloud and Remezcla for recent music by Latino artists for the soundtrack, as well as working with composer Ryan Beveridge. She was particularly concerned with creating a new, fresh soundtrack that avoided overused clichés common in American films featuring Latino characters, such as strumming guitars.

Themes 
Mosquita y Mari explores themes of coming-of-age and sexuality. The film is based on a "love story" between two teen girls, who never put words to their relationship. Guerrero comments that many people "experience queer feelings and queer identity at a very young age", whether or not they label them as such at the time, and she had wanted to capture this in her film. She has summarized the concept in discussing her own experiences, which inspired the film: "When looking back, long before I identified as queer, I realized my first love was one of my best friends. It was the type of friendship that was really tender and sweet and sexually charged but we never crossed that line." Besides sexuality, this experience also speaks to the process of coming of age, with Guerrero commenting that it transformed her from "just feeling comfortable in myself, to feeling like I was somebody, to feeling like I was Aurora and I belonged in the world."

The film also revolves around themes of immigration, class, and gender.

Critical reception 
Mosquita y Mari won the Outstanding First U.S. Dramatic Feature Film Award at Outfest 2012, the Queer Award at the 27th Torino GLBT Film Festival, and was nominated for the 28th annual Independent Spirit John Cassavetes Award. Lead actor Fenessa Pineda won Outfest's Outstanding Actress Award.

The New York Times praised Mosquita y Mari as "an unassuming indie jewel" that "resists all of the clichés that its story of the fraught friendship between two 15-year-old girls invites."

Autostraddle ranked the film 20th on its list of the 102 best lesbian films.

See also 
 List of LGBT-related films directed by women

References

External links

2010s coming-of-age drama films
2012 LGBT-related films
2012 films
American coming-of-age drama films
American LGBT-related films
Lesbian-related films
LGBT-related drama films
Films about Mexican Americans
2012 drama films
LGBT-related coming-of-age films
2010s English-language films
2010s American films